Heritage may refer to:

History and society
 A heritage asset is a preexisting thing of value today
 Cultural heritage is created by humans
 Natural heritage is not
 Heritage language

Biology
 Heredity, biological inheritance of physical characteristics
 Kinship, the relationship between entities that share a genealogical origin

Arts and media

Music
 Heritage (Earth, Wind & Fire album), 1990
 Heritage (Eddie Henderson album), 1976
 Heritage (Opeth album), 2011, and the title song
 Heritage Records (England), a British independent record label
 Heritage (song), a 1990 song by Earth, Wind & Fire

Other uses in arts and media
 Heritage (1935 film), a 1935 Australian film directed by Charles Chauvel
 Heritage (1984 film), a 1984 Slovenian film directed by Matjaž Klopčič
 Heritage (2019 film), a 2019 Cameroonian film by Yolande Welimoum
 Heritage (novel), a Doctor Who novel

Organizations

Political parties
 Heritage (Armenia), a liberal political party in Armenia
 Heritage Party (Zambia), a political party in Zambia

Schools
 Heritage Academy (disambiguation)
 Heritage Christian University
 Heritage College (disambiguation)
 Heritage School (disambiguation)
 Heritage High School (disambiguation)
 Heritage Institute of Technology, Kolkata
 American Heritage School (disambiguation)
 Christian Heritage School (disambiguation)

Other uses
 Ulmus parvifolia 'Zettler', a Chinese Elm cultivar sold under the marketing name Heritage

People with the surname
John Heritage, (born 1956), American sociologist
Peter Heritage (born 1960), English footballer
Steve Heritage, member of the American grindcore band Assück

See also
 List of heritage registers
 The Heritage (disambiguation)
 World Heritage Site
 English Heritage
 The Heritage Foundation
 Heritage Day (disambiguation)
 Heritage Foundation of Newfoundland and Labrador
 Heritage tourism
 Heritage Foods
 Heritage Great Britain PLC